Hazardia detonsa is a rare species of shrub in the family Asteraceae known by the common name island bristleweed. It is endemic to the Channel Islands of California, having been found on 4 islands (Santa Rosa, Santa Cruz, West Anacapa, and Middle Anacapa).

At the ends of its whitish stems it produces bell-shaped flower heads each about a centimeter long. Each flower head has several rows of white woolly phyllaries and an open end revealing disc florets and longer protruding ray florets. The florets are yellow and may age to red or purple. The main threat to this species on Santa Cruz Island was the presence of feral Santa Cruz sheep. The sheep have been removed, allowing the plant to begin its recovery there.

References

External links
  Calflora Database: Hazardia detonsa (Island bristleweed, Northern island haplopappus, Northern islands hazardia)
Jepson eFlora (TJM2) treatment of Hazardia detonsa
UC CalPhotos gallery of Hazardia detonsa images

detonsa
Endemic flora of California
Natural history of the Channel Islands of California
Natural history of the California chaparral and woodlands
Natural history of Santa Barbara County, California
Natural history of Ventura County, California
Plants described in 1883
Taxa named by Edward Lee Greene
Flora without expected TNC conservation status